Andreas Kundert (born 1 October 1984) is a Swiss athlete specialising in the 110 metres hurdles. He represented his country at two World Championships, in 2007 and 2011, without reaching the semifinals.

He has personal bests of 13.41 seconds in the 110 metres hurdles (+0.6 m/s, Luzern 2008) and 7.65 seconds in the 60 metres hurdles (Magglingen 2009). The first one is the current national record.

Competition record

References

1984 births
Living people
Swiss male hurdlers
World Athletics Championships athletes for Switzerland
Competitors at the 2005 Summer Universiade
Competitors at the 2011 Summer Universiade